The 2011 season was Kelantan's 3rd season in the Malaysia Super League. Kelantan were defending Malaysia Cup champions, and aimed for 2nd cup this season. In addition, they were competing in the domestic tournaments, the FA Cup and the Malaysia Cup.

Competitions

Overview

Charity Shield

The Sultan Haji Ahmad Shah Cup, more popularly known as Piala Sumbangsih (Charity Shield), is an annual soccer match currently contested by the current Malaysia Cup winner and the current Super League Malaysia winner.

Super League

Results summary

FA Cup

 Kelantan won on aggregate 5–2.

 Kelantan won on aggregate 6–2.

Malaysia Cup

* Kelantan lost on aggregate 3–5.

Group C

Team officials

Player statistics

Squad
Last updated 23 May 2013

Key:
 = Appearances,
 = Goals,
 = Yellow card,
 = Red card

* On loan from Pahang for Malaysia Cup campaign.

Goalscorers

Transfers

All start dates are pending confirmation.

In

Out

Loans In

Loans Out

See also
 List of Kelantan FA seasons

References

Kelantan FA
2011
Kelantan